"You Are My Friend" is a ballad co-written and recorded by American singer Patti LaBelle, released as the second single off her self-titled debut album, in 1978 on the Epic label. While it only reached as high as number sixty-one on the Billboard Hot-Selling Soul Singles chart upon its initial release, it has gone on to become one of the singer's signature anthems.

Overview

Background
Patti LaBelle ended an eighteen-year association with Nona Hendryx and Sarah Dash as their group Labelle had decided to break up. LaBelle reluctantly carried on with a solo career with the support of then-husband Armstead Edwards, who signed on as her personal manager. In the middle of recording her debut album in New Orleans with Chameleon producer David Rubinson, Labelle and Edwards wrote lyrics to a James "Budd" Ellison composition they called "You Are My Friend". The song was a tribute to the couple's only child, Zuri Edwards. The song was one of the last to be recorded for LaBelle's debut self-titled solo album.

Background and composition
"You Are My Friend" was musically composed by James Ellison, otherwise known as "Budd". Ellison was a longtime background musician for Labelle and had befriended the singer following Labelle's split. Prior to recording the song, Ellison and another Labelle musician, Edward Batts, co-wrote the song, "What Can I Do For You", for Labelle's 1974 album, Nightbirds, which became a modest hit. The lyrics were by Edwards and LaBelle themselves. Edwards and LaBelle wrote on previous Labelle albums together. The majority of the song was recorded under E major. Rubinson, who produced the song, included rhythm guitar, bass, drums and strings. Ellison played piano on the song and some of the background vocals were handled by The Waters and members of The Valentinos (Bobby Womack's former family group). One of its members, Cecil Womack, would later collaborate with LaBelle on her material with Philadelphia International Records in the early eighties. While the majority of the song was arranged as a pop ballad, gospel elements were included. This inclusion wouldn't be noticed until LaBelle's live performances of the song, which she and Ellison arranged.

Reception
Released in early 1978 as the second single from Patti LaBelle, the song was a relative failure on the R&B chart only peaking as high as number 61 and failing to even enter the Billboard Hot 100. The success of the song in its early years was due to LaBelle's live performances of the song. When she first performed the song in her first solo concert in London, LaBelle received a standing ovation, she received a similar one when she performed the song on TV the first time on Don Kirshner's Rock Concert as the last song she performed before leaving the stage.

The song received radio airplay on urban radio stations, which still continues today, and is regarded as one of LaBelle's signature songs.

Covers
One of the covers of the song was from singer Sylvester, recorded in San Francisco for his live album Living Proof. During the song, Sylvester was joined by The Weather Girls, who started off as Sylvester's backup singers, Two Tons Of Fun.  While he dedicated the song to LaBelle, it was clear that it was a love about him and The Weather Girls. That same year, disco group Kenny & Friends did a dance version of the song. In 2003 gospel singer Shirley Caesar recorded the song for her album Shirley Caesar & Friends which featured Patti LaBelle on the recording. Faith Evans did a live version paying tribute to LaBelle in 2001. LaBelle re-recorded the song for her album The Gospel According to Patti LaBelle, in 2006, as a tribute to her deceased collaborator, James Ellison.

Live performances
Patti LaBelle hardly leaves the stage without singing "You Are My Friend". In the early 1980s Labelle would include "What A Friend We Have In Jesus" which would lead her into "You Are My Friend".

Credits
Lead vocals by Patti LaBelle
Background vocals by James Gadson, Norma Harris, Ray Parker Jr., Rosie Casals, Sherri Barman, Yvonne Fair, Cecil Womack, Curtis Womack, Friendly Womack, Julia Waters & Maxine Waters
Lyrics written by Patti LaBelle and Armstead Edwards
Music written and arranged by James "Budd" Ellison
Produced by David Rubinson

References

1978 singles
Patti LaBelle songs
Sylvester (singer) songs
Rhythm and blues ballads
1978 songs
Epic Records singles
Songs about friendship
1970s ballads
Songs written by Patti LaBelle